Bridgnorth is a civil parish in Shropshire, England. It contains 252 listed buildings that are recorded in the National Heritage List for England. Of these, one is listed at Grade I, the highest of the three grades, twelve are at Grade II*, the middle grade, and the others are at Grade II, the lowest grade. The parish contains the town of Bridgnorth and the small villages of Quatford, Danesford, and Oldbury. The River Severn passes through the town, and divides it into two parts. The part on the western side is mainly hilly, and is known as High Town, and the part by the river and on its east side is much flatter, and is known as Low Town. The two parts are joined by a bridge over the river.

A castle and a collegiate church were established in High Town in the early 12th century, and the town grew following that. In the 13th century walls were built around the town, with five gateways. Most of the town was burnt down in 1646 during the Civil War, and it was rebuilt afterwards. Prosperity came in the 18th century with increasing river trade, but it has since declined, and the arrival of the railway in the 1850s did little to halt the decline. The town has since developed as a commuter town for the nearby cities.

Most of the listed buildings are in the High Town area of Bridgnorth, with a smaller group in Low Town near the bridge. The majority of these are houses and shops, many of them timber framed and dating from the 15th to 17th century, the best of these being Bishop Percy's House. Only a small fragment of the castle and the town walls have survived, and the only gateway is North Gate which is a 20th-century rebuilding on the original site. There are two churches that have retained a significant amount of medieval fabric, St Leonard's Church and St Mary Magdalene's Church in Quatford. The other listed buildings include public houses, hotels, clubs, offices, civic buildings, other churches, bridges, a bank, a folly, a warehouse, railway stations, a former textile mill, a drinking fountain, two conduit heads, a school, a war memorial, and a telephone kiosk.



Key

Buildings

Notes and references

Notes

Citations

Sources

Lists of buildings and structures in Shropshire
Listed